The Grundmann aldehyde synthesis is a chemical reaction that produces an aldehyde from an acyl halide.

Because of the Rosenmund reduction and DIBAL-H accomplish similar transformations, this reaction sequence is not practiced much currently.

References

Name reactions
Organic redox reactions